1909 in Argentine football saw Alumni win the championship, their 8th title in 10 seasons. Argentina won all three international trophies contested against Uruguay.

Primera División

The 1909 championship featured 10 teams, with each team playing the other twice. River Plate made its debuts at the top division while Lomas AC and Reformer were relegated, being the first teams in the history of Primera División to be relegated under the new system.

Final standings

Lower divisions

Primera B
Champion: Gimnasia y Esgrima (BA)

Primera C
Champion: Ferro Carril Oeste II

Domestic cups

Copa de Honor Municipalidad de Buenos Aires
Champion: San Isidro

Final

Copa Jockey Club
Champion: Alumni

Final

(*) During this edition Estudiantes (BA) set a record that persists nowadays, beating Lomas AC by 18-0. Moreover, Maximiliano Susan scored 12 goals, 7 of them within 20 minutes.

International cups

Tie Cup
Champion:  Alumni

Final

Copa de Honor Cousenier
Champion:  CURCC

Final

Argentina national team
Argentina retained both Copa Lipton and Copa Newton in 1909 and won the Copa Premier Honor Argentino for the first time.

Copa Lipton

Copa Newton

Copa Premier Honor Argentino

Friendly matches

References

 
Seasons in Argentine football